James Rogers House may refer to:

 James Mitchell Rogers House, Winston-Salem, North Carolina, listed on the National Register of Historic Places (NRHP) in Forsyth County
 James Rogers House (Belleview, Kentucky), NRHP-listed in Boone County

See also
Rogers House (disambiguation)